The 1925–26 Idaho Vandals men's basketball team represented the University of Idaho during the  NCAA college basketball season. Members of the Pacific Coast Conference, the Vandals were led by sixth-year head coach  and played their home games on campus at the Armory and Gymnasium in Moscow, Idaho.

References

External links
Sports Reference – Idaho Vandals: 1925–26 basketball season
Gem of the Mountains: 1926 University of Idaho yearbook – 1925–26 basketball season
Idaho Argonaut – student newspaper – 1926 editions

Idaho Vandals men's basketball seasons
Idaho
Idaho
Idaho